Diradius is a genus of webspinners in the family Teratembiidae. There are about 15 described species in Diradius.

Species
These 15 species belong to the genus Diradius:

 Diradius caribbeana (Ross, 1944)
 Diradius chiapae (Ross, 1944)
 Diradius diversilobus Ross, 1984
 Diradius emarginatus (Ross, 1944)
 Diradius erba Szumik, 1991
 Diradius excisa (Ross, 1944)
 Diradius fairchildi Ross, 1992
 Diradius jalapae (Ross, 1944)
 Diradius lobatus (Ross, 1944)
 Diradius nouges Szumik, 2001
 Diradius pacificus (Ross, 1940)
 Diradius pallidus Ross, 1984
 Diradius pusillus Friederichs, 1934
 Diradius uxpanapaensis (Mariño & Márquez, 1982)
 Diradius vandykei (Ross, 1944)

References

Further reading

 

Embioptera
Articles created by Qbugbot